Frank Bernard Walker (born August 6, 1981) is a former American football cornerback in the National Football League for the Green Bay Packers, Baltimore Ravens, Minnesota Vikings and Dallas Cowboys. He was drafted by the New York Giants in the sixth round of the 2003 NFL Draft. He played college football at Tuskegee University.

Early years
Walker attended Booker T. Washington High School, where he practiced football, baseball and track. As a senior, he played running back in six games, rushing for 948 yards and 12 touchdowns. He finished third in the state in the 100-yard dash.

Walker accepted a football scholarship from Tuskegee University. As a freshman, he appeared in 9 games playing mostly on special teams. As a junior, he appeared in 9 games, playing right cornerback opposite Drayton Florence. He also was employed as a nickel back.

He contributed to the school winning 3 consecutive SIAC Football Championships (2000-2002). He finished his college career with 92 tackles (64 solo), 2 sacks, 6 tackles for loss, 6 interceptions and 34 passes defensed. In 2013, his jersey number was retired by Tuskegee University.

Professional career

New York Giants
Walker was selected by the New York Giants in the 6th round (207th overall) of the 2003 NFL Draft. As a rookie, he played in ten games, recording 74 tackles and 2 interceptions. He made his NFL debut on October 26 against the Minnesota Vikings.

In 2004, he appeared in 13 games, missing the first 3 with a broken sesamoid bone. He had one start at right cornerback against the Cincinnati Bengals. He posted 12 tackles, 2 interceptions, 3 passes defensed, 7 special teams tackles and one forced fumble.

In 2005, he appeared in 7 games and was inactive for 7 contests, including the last 5 of the season. He suited up but did not play in 2 games. He registered one interception and 2 special teams tackles.

In 2006, he appeared in 11 games, with one start against the Tennessee Titans. He recorded 8 tackles (5 solo) and 2 special teams tackles.

Green Bay Packers
On March 13, 2007, he signed with the Green Bay Packers as a free agent. Despite being brought in to be the third cornerback on the depth chart, Walker played a reduced role with the Packers during their 13-3 regular season run to their eventual loss to the New York Giants in the 2007 NFC Championship game.

He appeared in 12 games, playing as the nickel and dime back, while tallying 10 tackles (9 solo), one pass defensed and 12 special teams tackles. On October 18, he had arthroscopic knee surgery and was forced to miss 4 games. After his one-year deal expired, he chose not to re sign with the Packers due to his lack of playing time.

Baltimore Ravens
On March 14, 2008, Walker was signed by the Baltimore Ravens to compete for the team's third cornerback position. He appeared in 15 games with 5 starts, tallying 33 tackles, one interception, 14 passes defensed, 2 special teams tackles and 2 forced fumbles. He was part of the NFL's second-ranked defense.

In December, Walker was accused of spitting in the mouth of Pittsburgh Steelers punter/holder Mitch Berger after Jeff Reed kicked an extra point in Pittsburgh's 13–9 win. He appeared to have tried to dive into Reed's knees. A brief scuffle ensued. Berger apparently tried to break it up. At that point the spitting was supposed to have occurred. Walker denied the incident being intentional.

In 2009, he appeared in 14 games with one start against the Indianapolis Colts. He struggled with penalties during the season. He registered 14 tackles and one interception.

Minnesota Vikings
On October 13, 2010, Walker signed with the Minnesota Vikings, after Cedric Griffin was lost for the season with a right knee injury. He appeared in 11 games with 2 starts against the New York Giants and Detroit Lions. He registered 17 tackles, one interception, five passes defensed and 7 special teams tackles. He was not re-signed after the season.

Tennessee Titans
On August 4, 2011, Walker signed with the Tennessee Titans to replace an injured Ryan Mouton. He was released on September 3.

Dallas Cowboys
On September 13, 2011, he was signed as a free agent by the Dallas Cowboys, reuniting with head coach Jason Garrett, who was a former teammate with the Giants. He played in 14 games as a backup, making 25 tackles and one interception. He was not re-signed after the season.

Personal life
His cousin Chad Lucas played wide receiver in the NFL.

References

1981 births
Living people
Sportspeople from Tuskegee, Alabama
Players of American football from Alabama
American football cornerbacks
Tuskegee Golden Tigers football players
New York Giants players
Green Bay Packers players
Baltimore Ravens players
Minnesota Vikings players
Tennessee Titans players
Dallas Cowboys players